Eucalyptus globulus subsp. bicostata, commonly known as  the southern blue gum, eurabbie, blue gum or Victorian blue gum, is a subspecies of tree that is endemic to south-eastern Australia. It has mostly smooth bark with some persistent slabs of old bark at the base, juvenile leaves with one glaucous side, glossy, lance-shaped adult leaves, warty flower buds in groups of three, white flowers and hemispherical to conical fruit.

Description
The bark is mostly smooth, shedding in long strips to leave a white or greyish surface. There is sometimes rough, partially shed bark at the base of the trunk and ribbons of shedding bark in the upper branches. Young plants and coppice regrowth have stems that are more or less square in cross-section, with a prominent wing on each corner.

Flowering mainly occurs between January and March and the flowers are white.

Taxonomy and naming
Southern blue gum was first formally described by Joseph Henry Simmonds in the book Trees from other lands for shelter and timber in New Zealand: Eucalypts and given the name Eucalyptus bicostata. In 1974, James Barrie Kirkpatrick reduced E. bicostata to the subspecies, E. globulus subsp. bicostata. The change has been accepted by the Australian Plant Census.
The epithet bicostata is derived from the Latin bicostatus, "two-ribbed", referring to the buds and fruit.

Distribution and habitat
Southern blue gum grows in open forest in mountainous, largely inland country in New South Wales and Victoria. It is found between the Carrai National Park on the Northern Tablelands of New South Wales and the ranges of eastern Victoria.

Gallery

References 

globulus
Myrtales of Australia
Flora of New South Wales
Flora of Victoria (Australia)
Plants described in 1927